Pojăreni is a commune in Ialoveni District, Moldova.

Notable people
 Teodor Suruceanu

References

Villages of Ialoveni District